Route 79 is a highway in eastern Missouri.  Its northern terminus is at Interstate 72/U.S. Route 36 in downtown Hannibal; its southern terminus is at Interstate 70 in St. Peters.  The route closely parallels the Mississippi River.

History
When Route 79 was created in about 1930, it replaced the north–south section of Route 56, which had been created in 1922 between Troy and O'Fallon. The part of Route 56 west of Winfield became an extension of Route 47.

Route 79 had major closures as a result of the Mississippi River floods of 2019 and other recent floods. Its buckling pavement in summer 2019 was attributed to hotter and more erratic climate conditions.

Major intersections

References

079
St. Peters, Missouri
Hannibal, Missouri
079
Transportation in St. Charles County, Missouri
Transportation in Lincoln County, Missouri
Transportation in Pike County, Missouri
Transportation in Ralls County, Missouri
Transportation in Marion County, Missouri